The Shadows No. 2 is an extended play 45 rpm record released in 1961 by The Shadows. It was released on Columbia Records/EMI Records as SEG 8148 in mono and reached #12 in the UK EP charts in January, 1962.

All the songs on the record had previously been released on the album The Shadows, and more songs from the album were to be released on the EP The Shadows No. 3.  There appears never to have been a The Shadows No. 1, though this could simply be a nickname for the first Shadows EP.

The liner notes were written by Cliff Richard.

Track listing
Side 1
 "Shadoogie"  (Hank Marvin, Bruce Welch, Jet Harris, Tony Meehan)
 "Nivram"  (Marvin, Welsh, Harris)

Side 2
 "Baby My Heart"  (Sonny Curtis)
 "See You in My Drums" (Meeham)

Personnel
 Hank Marvin – Lead Guitar, piano, vocals
 Bruce Welch – Rhythm guitar
 Tony Meehan – Drums
 Jet Harris – Bass guitar
 Norrie Paramor – Recording manager

References

1961 EPs
The Shadows EPs
EMI Columbia Records EPs